The 2006 South American Championships in Athletics were held at the Estadio La Independencia in Tunja, Colombia from 29 September to 1 October. The competition represented a departure from the traditional biennial cycle of the championships, a decision taken partly as a response to the lack of major competitions that year for the region's athletes, as well as the fact many athletes would instead focus on the 2007 World Championships in Athletics and the Pan American Games (in Rio de Janeiro) which were scheduled for the following year. The stadium's location at 2810 metres above sea level aided the performances of athletes competing in the sprint and field events. A total of 44 events were contested, of which 22 by male and 22 by female athletes.

Brazil continued its dominance in the medals and points tables with 26 gold medals and 55 medals in all, adding to an undefeated streak in the men's and women's sides since the 1975 edition. The hosts Colombia were clear runners-up with nine golds and 36 medals, while Argentina and Ecuador were the next most successful nations. Cold, windy conditions affected athletes performances over the course of the three-day competition, but five Championships records were broken or equalled. Pole vaulter Fabiana Murer won her first continental title with a record clearance of 4.40 m, while Argentine Germán Chiaraviglio equalled the best mark in the men's event. Jessé de Lima beat defending high jump champion Gilmar Mayo in a record height and Jennifer Dahlgren retained her hammer throw title with a new record.

Colombian Bertha Sánchez became champion in three events (5000 m, 10,000 m and steeplechase) and her compatriot Caterine Ibargüen took a gold and two silver medals in the jumping events, as well as setting a national record in the triple jump. Brazil's Elisângela Adriano won both the shot put and discus throw disciplines. Two more of her compatriots scored event doubles: Lucimar Teodoro won the 400 metres and the 400 metres hurdles, while the 100 metres and 200 metres titles went to Rosemar Coelho Neto.

Records

Men

Women

Medal summary

Men

Women

Medal table

Points table
Totals are calculated by awarding a country points for each time an athlete finishes in the top six of an event.

Participation

 (30)
 (4)
 (68)
 (18)
 (63)
 (28)
 (1)
 (2)
 (2)
 (3)
 (3)
 (7)

References
Specific

Results
Biscayart, Eduardo (2006-10-02). Brazil confirms its South American domination in Tunja. IAAF. Retrieved on 2010-07-22.
 (archived)

External links

South American
South American Championships in Athletics
International athletics competitions hosted by Colombia
South American Championships
2006 in South American sport
September 2006 sports events in South America
October 2006 sports events in South America